Duo Caron is a classical music group who transcribed and performed great orchestral works for two pianos and piano four hands.

History 
Born in Rimouski, Quebec, Canada, sibling pianists Josee and Martin Caron have lived in Montreal for a number of years.   They started collaborating under the name Duo Caron in 1990, mostly arranging and playing orchestral works for two pianos and piano duet. The originality of this project has earned them numerous concert appearances including at national and international festivals.

Premieres

Alan Belkin's Petite Suite for two pianos, commissioned by the Duo Caron, was premiered by Duo Caron in Montreal's Claude-Champagne Concert Hall (June 1996). In 1998, the Quebec International Duo-Piano Festival commissioned to Martin Caron a George Gershwin transcription for two pianos eight hands, "Strike up the Band", premiered at the Gala Concert, pour terminer l'événement de façon spectaculaire.

Released in 2009, the CD British Music for Piano Four Hands  includes two new arrangements by Martin Caron of Paul McCartney's works.  American Record Guide qualified this CD as a "wonderful release". L’Avantage noted "Précision remarquable" about the interpretation of William Walton's Music for Children.  Duo Caron's recordings include a CD of post-Romantic works  and another of works by Tchaikovsky.

Their recordings are broadcast on CBC, SRC, "Radio Classique" CJPX, CKUA Radio Network Edmonton, and RTBF Radio "Musiq’3" Belgium.

Transcriptions by Martin Caron

For Two Pianos‚ Four Hands 
 Felix Mendelssohn Bartholdy (1809–1847): Symphony No 4 in A major Italian
 Modest Mussorgsky (1839–1881): Night on Bald Mountain‚ symphonic poem
 Arnold Schoenberg (1874–1951): Verklärte Nacht op. 4 for string sextet ("Transfigured Night")
 Richard Strauss (1864–1949):
 Don Juan op, 20‚ symphonic poem
 Till Eulenspiegel's Merry Pranks, symphonic poem
 Metamorphosen, study for 23 solo strings
 Pyotr Ilyich Tchaikovsky (1840–1893): Symphony No. 4 in F minor‚ op. 36
 Richard Wagner (1813–1883): Overture from the opera Die Meistersinger von Nürnberg

For Piano Duet 
 Sir Edward Elgar (1857–1934): Introduction and Allegro for Strings Op. 47
 Ralph Vaughan Williams (1872–1958): Overture from the opera The Wasps

For Four Pianos‚ Eight Pianists 
 Sergei Rachmaninoff (1873–1943): Isle of the Dead op. 29‚ symphonic poem
 Pyotr Ilyich Tchaikovsky (1840–1893):  Symphony No. 4 in F minor‚ op. 36

For Two Pianos‚ Four Pianists 
 George Gershwin (1898–1937): "Strike up the Band"

Arrangements by Martin Caron

For Piano Duet 
 Paul McCartney (1942- ?):
 A Leaf for piano solo
 Appaloosa-Meditation‚ orchestral suite

Discography 
 1992 - Transcriptions for Two Pianos Four Hands (Société Nouvelle d’Enregistrement, SNE-582-CD)
 1995 - Tchaikovsky for Four Hands (ATMA Classique, ACD 2-2102)
 2009 - British Music for Piano Four Hands  (XXI-21 Productions Inc., XXI-CD 2 1603)
 2012 - Mendelssohn‚ Transcriptions for 4 hands  (Société Métropolitaine du Disque Inc./Espace 21, SMD 225-1)

Footnotes

Citations

References 

 Official website - Biography
 Transcriptions pour deux pianos, quatre mains entry in Iris Catalogue – Bibliothèque et Archives nationales du Québec
 Classical Music Magazine, vol. 19 No. 4, December 1996
 Tchaikovsky, 4 hands entry in Iris Catalogue – Bibliothèque et Archives nationales du Québec
 Suite casse-noisette, opus 71a ; Capriccio italien, opus 45 ; Symphonie no 4 en fa mineur, opus 36 - Tchaikovsky entry in Bibliothèque de Trois-Rivières - Catalogue
 British music for piano four hands entry in Iris Catalogue – Bibliothèque et Archives nationales du Québec

External links 
 Official website
 Rimouski, Que, entry in The Canadian Encyclopedia / The Encyclopedia of Music in Canada
 "Josée et Martin Caron", from Arnold Schönberg Center

Musical groups established in 1990
Canadian classical music groups
Musical groups from Montreal
Caron
Canadian musical duos
1990 establishments in Quebec